Efrat (also, Efrata) is an Israeli settlement in the Etzion bloc.

Efrat (Hebrew: אפרת) is a name with Hebrew origins that can also refer to:

Efrat (organization), an Israeli charity which provides money to women considering abortion for financial reasons
Ephrath, a biblical place in Judea, for which the modern settlement of Efrat is named
Efrata (Ethiopia), a former district in the historic Ethiopian province of Shewa; sometimes used in the 19th century to refer to Shewa itself
In Russian, a possible transliteration of the river Euphrates

People:
 Benni Efrat (born 1936), an Israeli artist 
 Daniel Efrat born 1982), an Israeli actor, director, and translator
 Efrat Abramov (born 1980), an Israeli TV anchor and screenwriter
 Efrat Gosh (born 1983), an Israeli singer-songwriter
 Efrat Natan, Israeli artist